The Algerian Football Federation (AFF); (FAF) is the governing body of football in Algeria. It was formed in 1962 and was based in the capital Algiers. It has jurisdiction on the Algerian football league system and is in charge of the men's and women's national teams. Although an unofficial national team had played fixtures since 1958, the first recognized international took place in January 1963, some six months after independence. In 2021, twenty structures were added to the Algerian Football Federation.
Algeria has to work with new players but has already qualified for AFCON 2021. AFCON stands for Africa Cup of Nations. Algeria has 17 players in French Ligue 1. The Algerian Football Federation is considered a member of FIFA.

Competitions

Men
Professional leagues
Ligue 1
Ligue 2

Amateur leagues
National
Inter-Régions
Régional I
Régional II
Wilaya

Cups
Algerian Cup
Algerian Super Cup
Algerian League Cup       (return 2020/2021)

Women
Algerian Women's Championship
Algerian Women's Championship D2

Youth
Similar as senior competitions.

Sponsors 

 Mobilis
 Coca-Cola
 Adidas
 Condor electronics
 Aspetar
 El Rayan Healthcare

Logo history

References

External links

  Official website
 Algeria at the FIFA website.
 Algeria at CAFOnline

Algeria
 
Football
Sports organizations established in 1962